Pseudorhicnoessa is a genus of beach flies, insects in the family Canacidae (formally Tethinidae). All species are Indopacific in distribution .

Species
P. rattii Munari, 1981
P. spinipes Malloch, 1914
P. longicerca Munari, 2014

References

Canacidae
Carnoidea genera